Dharam Dev Solanki (born 20 March 1950) is a leader of Bharatiya Janata Party and a former member of the Delhi Legislative Assembly. He was elected to the assembly in 1993, 2003, 2008 and 2013 from Palam.

References

1950 births
Delhi MLAs 2013–2015
Living people
Place of birth missing (living people)
Bharatiya Janata Party politicians from Delhi